The Conejo Grade is a 7% grade incline on a section of US 101 (the Ventura Freeway). Also known as the Camarillo Grade, it links Thousand Oaks and cities of the Conejo Valley, with Camarillo and the cities on the Oxnard Plain.

The Conejo Mountain has functioned as a barrier by separating Ventura County into East County and West County. Historically, the mountain was known for its many jackrabbits and prickly pear cacti. The surrounding area was formed by volcanic eruptions millions of years ago, a rare geological formation in Southern California. Within the traditional lands of the Chumash people, they had a trading trail through the pass, and it later served as a trading route for farmers and their wagons down the Conejo Grade to the Hueneme wharf. Traffic kept increasing and the road was straightened and relocated in 1935. The new road was a mile shorter and only had twelve curves.

History
Designated as part of the commemorative route of El Camino Real, the steep slope or grade was called the "cuesta del conejo" (slope of the rabbit). Early European settlers in the Conejo Valley, known as the Norwegian Colony, needed a safe way to move bales of hay and sacks of wheat and barley to the Hueneme Wharf on the Oxnard Plain. After several mishaps while hauling crops down here and at the Potrero grade, they decided to construct a new route into the Santa Rosa Valley. The Norwegian Grade was carved out of a steep canyon hillside by members of the community and their hired help, between 1900 and 1911.

Land for the highway was originally part of the Rancho El Conejo, with contributions from Adolfo Camarillo. A road was in place by no later than 1929, as a re-alignment had been done then. Further widening and reduction of blind curves occurred in the 1930s. Caltrans worked on the current grade setup, when the highway was brought to freeway standards in the 1950s. Portions of the original highway continue to receive use as side roads.

A young male mountain lion, P-55, left the Santa Monica Mountains in 2017 by crossing the freeway on the grade during the night. The animal was wearing a tracking collar used by the National Park researchers studying the mountain lions in the Santa Monica Mountains National Recreation Area. The National Park Service has recorded a dozen mountain lions struck and killed by motorists on this section of freeway since 2002 when they began the study. The proposed Wallis Annenberg Wildlife Crossing is intended to primarily benefit the mountain lion population indigenous to the Santa Monica Mountains, which has declined due to the Ventura Freeway acting as a barrier in the wildlife corridor between the Simi Hills to the north and the Santa Monica Mountains to the south. The Ventura County Transportation Commission, CalTrans and the National Park Service with support from the National Wildlife Federation are considering building another wildlife crossing here to connect the natural habitat on both sides of the freeway.

The Hill fire temporarily closed the freeway on November 8, 2018 as Santa Ana Winds pushed the fire to the south towards Newbury Park and California State University Channel Islands. The fire was contained with minimal damage on November 16.

See also
U.S. Route 101 in California

References

External links
 LMU|LA: Conejo Grade, Coast Highway
 US 101 Photo Gallery: Conejo Valley and Grade

Roads in Ventura County, California
U.S. Route 101
Santa Monica Mountains
Geography of Ventura County, California
History of Ventura County, California
Historic trails and roads in California
Camarillo, California
Conejo Valley
Geography of Thousand Oaks, California